Son Se-bin (born May 27, 1989) is a South Korean actress.

Biography 
Son debuted as an actress in the small screen under the name Lee Yoo-na in the 2004 SBS TV series . However, her official debut was in 2010 SBS TV series Three Sisters. She then appeared in minor roles in the TV series Coffee House, and the films You're My Pet and City in Blossom. In 2012, Son changed her name from Lee Yoo-na to Son Se-bin, and appeared on the film  using her new name. Following her appearances in the two 2013 SBS TV series, Two Women's Room and One Well-Raised Daughter, which established her career as an actress, she signed a contract with Diorgol Entertainment in 2014.

In 2015, Son appeared in a Clarisonic television commercial.

In 2016, Son signed an exclusive modeling contract with YGKPlus, and participated in 2017 as a runway model at the 2018 S/S Seoul Fashion Week for Moon Jung-wook's brand, Nineteeneighty, collection.

In 2019, she signed an exclusive contract with Wooridle Company. During the 2020 S/S Seoul Fashion Week, Son appeared as the opening model for Nineteeneighty's collection.

Filmography

Television series

Film

Awards

References

External links 
  

South Korean film actresses
South Korean television actresses
1989 births
Living people
21st-century South Korean actresses